Mu Virginis, Latinized from μ Virginis, is a star in the zodiac constellation of Virgo. It was listed in the Calendarium of Al Achsasi al Mouakket as rijl al-‘awwā’, Arabic رجل العواء, meaning "The foot of the barking (dog)". With an apparent visual magnitude of 3.88, it is bright enough to be seen with the naked eye. The position of the star near the celestial equator means it is visible from most of the Earth. Based upon parallax measurements, Mu Virginis is located some 59.6 light-years from the Sun.

Rijl al Awwa is an F-type main-sequence star with a stellar classification of F2 V, although it does show some evidence of being a more evolved star. It has an effective temperature of 6,751 K in its outer atmosphere. The estimated age of the star is 1.5 billion years, and it has a relatively high 47.0 km/s projected rotational velocity. A 1990 study of the star gave it a giant star classification, and modeled it with 1.7 times the mass of the Sun, 2.1 times the Sun's radius, and shining with 9.8 times the Sun's luminosity.

Past observations of this star show some indications of short-term chromospheric variability as well as radial velocity variations. It has a candidate common proper motion companion at a projected separation of 770 AU. This object has a J band magnitude of 10.72.

References

F-type main-sequence stars
Virgo (constellation)
Virginis, Mu
Durchmusterung objects
Virginis, 107
9491
129502
071957
5487
Rijl al Awwa